Warkworth is a locality in the Singleton Council region of New South Wales, Australia.

Warkworth Post Office opened on 1 November 1863 and closed on 30 November 1968.

Warkworth Public School opened as Cockfighter's Creek in May 1859, was renamed Warkworth that June, closed in March 1861, reopened in 1869 and closed in February 1997.

St Philip's Anglican Church has an active congregation and holds fortnightly services. It has a church cemetery with graves dating from 1854 until the present day. The remains of the former Warkworth General Cemetery adjoin the ongoing Anglican cemetery.

It contains an active open-cut coal mine, operated jointly with another mine at Mount Thorley as the Mount Thorley Warkworth operation. It has been owned by Yancoal since 2017.

Heritage listings
Warkworth has a number of heritage-listed sites, including:
 Wambo Homestead

References

 
Localities in New South Wales